Kristen den Hartog (born 1965) is a Canadian fiction and memoir writer. She is the author of four novels; And Me Among Them, her most recent, was published in 2011.

Den Hartog was born in Deep River, Ontario.

The 2003 novel The Perpetual Ending was one of the finalists at the Toronto Book Awards.

Den Hartog lives in Ontario, with homes in Toronto and the Ottawa Valley.

Bibliography

Fiction
 Water Wings. Toronto: Knopf Canada, 2001.  (hardcover),  (paperback)
 The Perpetual Ending. Toronto: Knopf Canada, 2003.  (paperback)
 Origin of Haloes. Toronto: McClelland and Stewart, 2005. 
 And Me Among Them. Calgary: Freehand Books, 2011.

Non-fiction
 The Occupied Garden: A Family Memoir of War-Torn Holland. Toronto: McClelland and Stewart, 2009.

External links
 Random House: Kristen den Hartog, accessed 3 July 2006
 An Interview with Kristen Den Hartog, accessed 3 February 2010
 Simon and Schuster: Kristen Den Hartog, accessed 20 December 2016

References

1965 births
Living people
Canadian women novelists
Writers from Ontario
People from Renfrew County
21st-century Canadian novelists
21st-century Canadian women writers